Joan Manuel Gamboa Bermúdez (born 28 March 1997) is a Uruguayan footballer who plays as a right back.

Career

Rampla Juniors
A graduate of the club's youth academy, Gamboa made his professional debut on 8 July 2017, coming on as an 83rd-minute substitute for Ignacio Panzariello in a 1–0 victory over Liverpool Montevideo. After three years and five first team appearances, Gamboa departed the club at the end of the 2019 season.

References

External links

1997 births
Living people
Uruguayan footballers
Association football defenders
Footballers from Montevideo
Rampla Juniors players
Uruguay Montevideo players
Uruguayan Primera División players